The Doniphan County Courthouse Square Historic District in Troy, Kansas is a  historic district which was listed on the National Register of Historic Places in 2002.  It is roughly bounded by E. Walnut, E Chestnut, S. Main, and S. Liberty Streets.  The district included 17 contributing buildings and one contributing site.

It includes Italianate and Queen Anne architecture.

Its contributing buildings include:
Doniphan County Courthouse (1906), which was previously separately listed on the National Register.
Cyrus Leland Store Building (1911), 102 E. Walnut
McClellan Mercantile Building (1900), 120 E. Walnut
Mabel Perry Campbell House (c.1912), 115 E. Chestnut
Sol Miller Building (c.1870), 101 S. Main
Boder Brothers Bank/First National Bank (1872), 137 S. Main

References

Government buildings on the National Register of Historic Places in Kansas
Italianate architecture in Kansas
Queen Anne architecture in Kansas
Doniphan County, Kansas
Historic districts on the National Register of Historic Places in Kansas